Tan Soo Seng, better known as Chen Shucheng, (born 21 October 1949) is a Singaporean actor and television host. He is one of Mediacorp's few artistes still active from the "black and white" era.

Career

Acting
Chen joined Mediacorp, then known as Radio Television Singapore (RTS), as an actor in 1971. Since then he has portrayed many different roles ranging from a young nerdy doctor in The Awakening, a rich flirting playboy in Pretty Faces, the famous philanthropist, Tan Kah Kee in the war drama, The Price of Peace to a strict and unbending father in Love at 0°C .

Chen's work was recognised in 2007 when he was awarded the "Evergreen Veteran" award at the Star Awards 2007 anniversary special. After being nominated many times, he won his first acting award in Star Awards 2012 for his role in The Oath and received a standing ovation from both colleagues and fans. In Star Awards 2018 , he was nominated for Best Supporting Actor for the drama, Home Truly .

Chen has gotten 2 out of 10 Top 10 Most Popular Male Artistes in 2019 and 2021 respectively.

Hosting
During the late 1990s, Chen was best known as host of long-running variety shows Econ Nite (宜康之夜) and Weekend Delight (欢乐周末夜) for over a decade.

Singing
He also had an album to his name in the 1970s. He sang in the Teochew dialect.

Personal life
Chen and Huang Peiru acted as a couple during The Awakening and married after the drama.

Filmography

Films

Television

Compilation album

Awards and nominations

References

External links
Profile on xinmsn

20th-century Singaporean male actors
21st-century Singaporean male actors
Singaporean male television actors
Singaporean people of Teochew descent
People from Johor
1949 births
Living people